Grudusk  is a village in Ciechanów County, Masovian Voivodeship, in east-central Poland. It is the seat of the gmina (administrative district) called Gmina Grudusk.

The village has a population of 1,500.

References

Grudusk